Chlebna  is a village in the administrative district of Gmina Jedlicze, within Krosno County, Subcarpathian Voivodeship, in south-eastern Poland.

The village has an approximate population of 700. It border with Jedlicze and six other villages like: Potakówka, Długie, Wrocanka, Żarnowiec, Piotrówka, Poręby.

Settlement was established in the 14th century. In the second part of the 15th century village belonged to several knighthood families like: Żarnowscy, Mleczkowie, Chrząstowie.

There's a little football club named "Chlebianka".

References

Chlebna